Tazehabad-e Khachekin (also Romanized as Tāzehābād-e Khāchekīn; also known as Tāzehābād and Tāzehābād-e Khvāchekīn) is a village in Chukam Rural District, Khomam District, Rasht County, Gilan Province, Iran. At the 2006 census, its population was 1,146, in 322 families.

References 

Populated places in Rasht County